Changjiang Nuclear Power Plant is a nuclear power plant in Tangxing Village of Haiwei Township, Changjiang Li Autonomous County in the province of Hainan.  It is the first power plant of its kind in the province.

History
Construction of the first phase of the plant which consists of two reactors was approved by the National Development and Reform Commission in July 2008. Site works began in December 2008 and the first concrete was poured at the first unit on 25 April 2010.  The plant was built by China National Nuclear Corporation and China Huaneng Group.
Unit 1 was connected to the electricity grid on 7 November 2015 and is commercially operating starting on 25 December 2015.

In July 2019 China National Nuclear Corporation announced it would start building a demonstration ACP100 small modular reactor on the north-west side of the site by the end of the year.

Technical features
The plant will be built in two phases, both consisting of two CNP-600 pressurized water reactors, with a capacity of 650 MW each. The first unit was connected to the grid November 7, 2015 and second unit June 20, 2016. More than 70% of the equipment was planned to be indigenously made.

Second phase
On September 2, 2020, Premier Li Keqiang of the State Council presided over an executive meeting of the State Council. The meeting approved the Hainan Changjiang Nuclear Power Phase II project.
The total planned investment of the project is 39.45 billion yuan. Unit 3 is scheduled to pour the nuclear island's first concrete in August 2020 and will be completed in 2025; Unit 4 is scheduled to pour the nuclear island's first concrete in May 2021 and will be completed in 2026.

Reactor data

Pumped storage hydroelectricity
The 600 MW Hainan Qiongzhong pumped-storage hydroelectric plant helps to balance the nuclear plant by absorbing nighttime production and generating electricity during the day.

See also

List of major power stations in Hainan province
Nuclear power in China
List of nuclear reactors#China

References 

Nuclear power stations in China
Buildings and structures in Hainan
2014 establishments in China
Changjiang Li Autonomous County
Nuclear power stations with proposed reactors
Pumped-storage hydroelectric power stations in China